The 2019 Bournemouth, Christchurch and Poole Council election took place on 2 May 2019 to elect the inaugural members of Bournemouth, Christchurch and Poole Council in England, formed from the former unitary authorities of Bournemouth and Poole, and borough of Christchurch. At the same time an election for the new Christchurch Town Council was held.

A shadow authority comprising elected members of the three preceding councils and relevant members of Dorset County Council sat prior to the election. Elections for the two parish councils in the area were also held.

Background 
Bournemouth, Christchurch and Poole Council held elections on 2 May 2019 along with councils across England as part of the 2019 local elections. The council elected all of its councillors for the first time under the auspices of the combined council. The merger of Bournemouth Borough Council, Christchurch Borough Council and Poole Borough Council's councils to form this new council was reported to save £500,000 per year. A shadow authority of councillors for the three preceding councils and relevant members of Dorset County Council sat as a shadow authority prior to the election, with the Conservative group controlling the council and a majority of councillors being members of the Conservative Party. Parish councils in the area also held elections, such as the newly formed Christchurch town council, replacing the former Borough Council, and the Highcliffe and Walkford Neighbourhood Council. Whilst the shadow authority had 125 members, the redrawn ward boundaries meant that the newly elected body has 76 members.

Representatives from all of the main UK political parties, the Conservatives, the Liberal Democrats, Labour, Green Party of England and Wales and UKIP, stood for election to the new council. Alongside the national parties, several localist groups also stood for election, such as the Poole People, Alliance for Local Living and the Engage parties, as well as the informal Christchurch Independents group.

Poole People is a localist group which had previously stood in and won seats in the former Poole borough. For the 2019 election, they stood eight candidates in wards corresponding to Poole, winning seven seats in total. The Alliance for Local Living also stood parties, after being set up in 2018, and cooperating with Poole People; ALL intended to stand four candidates in total, but due to the timing of the official registration of the party, only two were able to be listed on the ballot paper; all four candidates also stood in Poole seats, but with only one win.

In March 2019, seven Conservative candidates, including the leader of the council David Flagg, were suspended from the party following their opposition to the merger. Five of the suspended councillors (David Flagg, Margaret Phipps, Lesley Dedman, Nick Geary and Janet Abbott) alongside two existing independents (Colin Bungey and Fred Neale) stood as 'Christchurch Independents', in opposition to the Conservatives, with those holding seats forming a group in the council after the election.

Overall results
The composition of the shadow authority immediately ahead of this election was:

Following the election, the composition of the council was:

Summary

Election result

|-

Aftermath 

The election resulted in no overall control, with no party winning the thirty-nine seats required for an overall majority; whilst the Conservatives were the largest party on the council, they lacked a majority. The Conservatives held seats in Bournemouth, with other parties and independents performing well in both Christchurch and Poole. The newly formed Christchurch Independents group, who were the third largest group with seven seats, said that they would be open to working with all parties except the Conservatives, who had led the creation of the new authority. Conservative councillor John Beesley said that the Conservatives should run the council, and that he was prepared to run a minority administration if no other party would support him. The Liberal Democrats also announced their intention to form a coalition with other parties on the council. Subsequently, Liberal Democrat Vikki Slade was elected council leader of a "Unity Alliance" of all the parties except the Conservatives and UKIP, with 39 members in total.

Within the council, six party groups were formed:

In 2022, councillors from the Conservatives and one from Poole People defected to form the Poole Local Group.

Ward results
The statement of persons nominated was posted by the authority on 5 April 2019, 299 candidates are standing. Asterisks (*) denote sitting councillors seeking re-election.

Alderney and Bourne Valley

Bearwood and Merley

Boscombe East and Pokesdown

Boscombe West

Bournemouth Central

Broadstone

Burton and Grange

Canford Cliffs

Canford Heath

Christchurch Town

Commons

Creekmoor

East Cliff and Springbourne

East Southbourne and Tuckton

Hamworthy

Highcliffe and Walkford

Kinson

Littledown and Iford

Moordown

Mudeford, Stanpit and West Highcliffe

Muscliff and Strouden Park

Newtown and Heatherlands

Oakdale

Parkstone

Penn Hill

Poole Town

Queen's Park

Redhill and Northbourne

Talbot and Branksome Woods

Wallisdown and Winton West

West Southbourne

Westbourne and West Cliff

Winton East

By-elections

Canford Heath

Commons

Highcliffe and Walkford

References
Notes

Citations

2019 English local elections
2019
2010s in Dorset
May 2019 events in the United Kingdom